The 2011–12 season is Persija's 81st competitive season, Persija was played in the Indonesian Super League and finished fifth at the end of the season. Bambang Pamungkas and Pedro Velázquez are the top scorer for Persija with 16 goals.

First-team squad

On loan

Transfers

In

Out

Club

Coaching Staff

Competitions

Classification

Indonesia Super League

References

See also
 2011–12 Indonesia Super League

Persija Jakarta seasons
Persija Jakarta